Miguel Ángel Castillo Sanhueza (born 25 August 1972) is a Chilean former professional footballer who played as a midfielder for clubs in Chile, Mexico and Bolivia.

Club career
A left-foot midfielder, Castillo is a product of Palestino youth system, playing for the club in three stints, scoring a total of 34 goals.

In Chile he also played for Huachipato, Unión San Felipe and Deportes La Serena in the Chilean Primera División. In the Primera B, he played for Colchagua, Naval and San Luis de Quillota.

Abroad, he played for the Mexican club León and the Bolivian club Jorge Wilstermann.

International career
In 2001, Castillo made an appearance for the Chile national team in the 2002 FIFA World Cup qualification match against Bolivia on 14 August.

Coaching career
He worked as manager of San Bernardo Unido in the Chilean Tercera B from 2015 to 2017.

References

External links
 
 
 Miguel Ángel Castillo at PlaymakerStats
 Miguel Ángel Castillo at PartidosdeLaRoja 

1972 births
Living people
Footballers from Santiago
Chilean footballers
Chilean expatriate footballers
Chile international footballers
Club Deportivo Palestino footballers
Deportes Colchagua footballers
Club León footballers
C.D. Huachipato footballers
Unión San Felipe footballers
Naval de Talcahuano footballers
Deportes La Serena footballers
C.D. Jorge Wilstermann players
San Luis de Quillota footballers
Chilean Primera División players
Primera B de Chile players
Liga MX players
Bolivian Primera División players
Chilean expatriate sportspeople in Mexico
Chilean expatriate sportspeople in Bolivia
Expatriate footballers in Mexico
Expatriate footballers in Bolivia
Association football midfielders
Chilean football managers